Cassirer is a surname of Yiddish origin (which means Cashier). Notable people with the surname include:

 Richard Cassirer (1868–1925), German neurologist
 Paul Cassirer (1871–1926), German art dealer and editor
 Bruno Cassirer (1872–1941), German publisher and gallery owner in Berlin
 Ernst Cassirer (1874–1945), German-Jewish philosopher
 Fritz Cassirer (1871–1926), German conductor
 Heinz Cassirer (1903–1979), German philosopher
 Wilfred Cass, born Wolfgang Cassirer (1924–2022), Founder of Cass Sculpture Foundation

See also 
 Jerome P. Kassirer (born 1932), American nephrologist

External links 
 History of the Cassirer family

Jewish surnames
Occupational surnames